Coleophora macedonica is a moth of the family Coleophoridae. It is found in Italy, Croatia and North Macedonia.

The larvae feed on the leaves of Hyssopus officinalis and possibly Thymus species.

References

macedonica
Moths described in 1959
Moths of Europe